Derek Currie was one of the first of three professionals to play in Asia when Hong Kong introduced professional football in 1970. Currie arrived in September 1970 along with fellow Scotsmen, Walter Gerrard and Jackie Trainer. Currie was also the first overseas professional to win the top goalscoring award in 1972 in Hong Kong. In 1978, he became the first professional to play for the Hong Kong National side and was followed by fellow professional, David Anderson and both competed for Hong Kong in the Asian Cup qualifying in Bangkok in 1979. By scoring against Sri Lanka, Currie was the first overseas professional to score in an International for the Hong Kong National side. During a three-month spell in San Antonio for the San Antonio Thunder in the NASL, Currie scored the official first goal in the Bicentennial League against St. Louis All-Stars, He scored both goals in their 2-1 win at the Alamo Stadium. Currie retired in 1982, playing his final farewell game against German side, VfB Stuttgart in Hong Kong.

References

External links
 NASL Jerseys profile

1949 births
Scottish footballers
Hong Kong footballers
Hong Kong international footballers
Association football forwards
Dumbarton F.C. players
Third Lanark A.C. players
Motherwell F.C. players
Hong Kong Rangers FC players
Seiko SA players
San Antonio Thunder players
Bulova SA players
Eastern Company SC players
Scottish expatriate footballers
Eastern Sports Club footballers
Naturalized footballers of Hong Kong
Scottish expatriate sportspeople in Hong Kong
Living people